Tursunovo Brdo is a village in the municipalities of Ugljevik (Republika Srpska) and Teočak, Bosnia and Herzegovina.

Demographics 
According to the 2013 census, its population was 215, all Bosniaks living in the Teočak part, thus none in the Ugljevik part.

References

Populated places in Teočak
Populated places in Ugljevik